Natalie Mahowald (born 1963) is an American Earth scientist who is the Irving Porter Church Professor of Engineering at Cornell University. Her research considers atmospheric transport of biogeochemically-relevant species, and the impact of humans on their environments.

Early life and education 
Mahowald studied physics and German at Washington University in St. Louis. She moved to the University of Michigan for her graduate studies, where she earned a master's degree in natural resource policy in 1993. After graduating, Mahowald moved to Germany, where she worked as a consultant on air solution. Mahowald was a doctoral student at Massachusetts Institute of Technology (MIT), where she studied atmospheric sciences. She was a postdoctoral scholar at Stockholm University.

Research and career 
Mahowald was appointed to faculty at the University of California, Santa Barbara. After leaving UCSB, Mahowald joined the National Center for Atmospheric Research (NCAR), where she studied the incorporation of aerosols. She moved to Cornell University in 2007.

Her research considers natural feedbacks in the climate system and how they respond to climate forcings. Amongst these, she has focused on mineral aerosols, fire, the carbon cycle and methane. Aerosols are small particles that cause haze, harm human health and damage air quality. Alongside her work on aerosols, Mahowald has studied soilborne plant pathogens.

In 2017 Mahowald was selected by the United Nations' Intergovernmental Panel on Climate Change (IPCC) to be lead author on the “Special Report on Global Warming of 1.5 degrees Celsius,”. The report evaluated the costs, benefits, tradeoffs and synergies that look to achieve global warming below 1.5 °C. It revealed the finding that a 0.5 °C temperature increase would result in extreme effects on weather events.

Awards and honors 
 2006 American Meteorological Society Henry G. Houghton Award
 2011 American Meteorological Society Fellow
 2013 Elected Fellow of the American Geophysical Union
 2013 Appointed Guggenheim Foundation Fellow
 2015 Thomson ISI Highly Cited Researcher
 2018 United Nations Intergovernmental Panel on Climate Change Report Chief Author
 2019 Cornell University Research Excellence Award
 2019 Cornell University Provost Research Innovation Award
 2020 Elected Fellow of the American Association for the Advancement of Science

Selected publications 
 </ref>
 </ref>

References

External links 

 
 

1963 births
Living people
Cornell University faculty
American earth scientists
21st-century American women scientists
American women academics
Washington University in St. Louis alumni
University of Michigan alumni
Massachusetts Institute of Technology alumni